Whittington is a village and civil parish in north west Shropshire, England, lying east and north-east of Oswestry. The parish had a population of 2,592 at the 2011 census.  The village of Whittington is in the centre of the parish, and three smaller villages, Park Hall to its west, Hindford to the north-east and Babbinswood to the south, are also within the parish.

History 

Whittington appears to have inhabited since prehistoric times, and may have been a Dark Age fortress of some eminence, with an extensive settlement recorded in the Domesday Book. Whittington has been identified with Trefwen (white-town), the famous stronghold of Cynddylan king of Pengwern.

Whittington was granted to William Peverel probably in the summer of 1114 when King Henry I of England invaded Powys. William probably founded Whittington Castle which was taken from his descendants by the Welsh under Madog ap Maredudd of Powys and later granted to Roger Powys by King Henry II. It remained in the Powys family until King John granted it to the FitzWarin family, namely  Fulk III FitzWarin(d.1258) whose life is recorded in a mediaeval romance.

In 1221, Henry III gave grudging permission for the castle to be re-built in stone after it had fallen to Llywelyn the Great. It was recaptured by Llywelyn in 1223 but was handed back the same year. It remained in the hands of the FitzWarins until 1420.

The castle ruins still exist today and were recently renovated. They are open to the public.

A small silver decorative brooch dating back to between 1115 and 1400 AD was discovered in a field outside Whittington in 2019.

Governance
Whittington Parish Council is the first tier of local government, while most administrative functions are carried out by Shropshire Council, a unitary authority. Elections to both bodies are ordinarily held on the same day, every four years.

An electoral ward and an electoral division of the same name exists.The ward stretches south to West Felton with a total population taken at the 2011 census of 4,067. The electoral division includes both Whittington parish and West Felton parish.

Railways
 
Two railway stations once served Whittington. The Shrewsbury to Chester Line (via Wrexham), of the former Great Western Railway, is still an operating route, but  station on this line closed on 12 September 1960 although there have been numerous campaigns over the years to have it reopened.  station was on the main line of the Cambrian Railways. However, the section from Whitchurch to Welshpool (Buttington Junction), via Ellesmere, Whittington, Oswestry and Llanymynech, closed on 18 January 1965 in favour of the more viable alternative route via Shrewsbury, although Whittington (High Level) station itself had closed earlier, on 4 January 1960.

Present day
Whittington parish includes Park Hall. This was previously an army training camp, but now is residential and farming land.

There is a small amount of light industry based mainly on the Whittington Business Park on the road to Oswestry. A further group of businesses operate from premises off North Drive, Park Hall. Industry and warehousing is also located at the edge of the parish, close to the main A5 road.

The largest employer within the parish is BT (previously British Telecom) which has its National Network Management Centre on the Whittington Road, home of the UK's Speaking Clock.

Notable people
Walsham How (1823–1897), later first Bishop of Wakefield, was Rector of Whittington 1851–1879.

See also
Listed buildings in Whittington, Shropshire
Halston Hall

References

 P. Brown, P. King, and P. Remfry, 'Whittington Castle: The marcher fortress of the Fitz Warin family', Shropshire Archaeology and History LXXIX (2004), 106-127.
 Remfry, P.M., Whittington Castle and the families of Bleddyn ap Cynfyn, Peverel, Maminot, Powys and Fitz Warin

External links 

Whittington Parish Council
Info from Genuki website
Oswestry website photos of Whittington Castle today
BBC Shropshire feature on the castle restoration

Villages in Shropshire
Civil parishes in Shropshire